FBB may refer to:
 FBB (F6FBB), a packet radio messaging system
 FBBank, a defunct Greek bank
 Federação de Bandeirantes do Brasil, the Girl Guide Federation of Brazil
 Female bodybuilding
 FinBank Burundi, a Burundian bank
 Flughafen Berlin Brandenburg GmbH, a German airport operator
 Folding boxboard
 Foundation Beyond Belief, a humanist charity that promotes secular volunteering and responsible charitable giving.
 The Fresh Beat Band, an American television series
 Führerbegleitbrigade, a German armoured brigade of World War II
 Full Basket Belize, an American charity